Agassiz is a provincial electoral division in the Canadian province of Manitoba. It was created by redistribution in 2008, out of parts of Ste. Rose and Turtle Mountain.

Communities in the riding include Gladstone, Neepawa, McCreary, Carberry, MacGregor and Westbourne. The riding's population in 2006 was 20,805.

List of provincial representatives

Election results

2011 general election

2016 general election

2019 general election

References

Manitoba provincial electoral districts